Dwarkadas Prahladadas Kothari (born 7 October 1944) is an educationist and professor who has held leadership positions at engineering institutions in India including IIT Delhi, Visvesvaraya National Institute of Technology, Nagpur and VIT University, Vellore. Currently, He is with Electrical Engineering Department as Hon. Adjunct Professor.  As a recognition of his contributions to engineering education, he was honoured as an IEEE Fellow. Previously he was Vice-Chancellor at VIT University.. On his 75th Birthday (07.10.2019), he was given the title of "Electrical Professor" by all his research scholars, faculty and well-wishers and a personal website of him was launched titled www.electricalprofessor.com. The 75th birthday also marks his 50 years of professional experience.

Early life 
D. P. Kothari was born in Bikaner, Rajasthan, India. He completed his schooling at G. B. M. M. Higher Secondary School in Hinganghat, Maharashtra. 
He attended BITS, Pilani, from where he earned his Bachelor in Engineering degree in Electrical Engineering (Class of 1967). He studied for his master's degree in Power Systems at BITS, Pilani (Class of 1969) where he continued to pursue his Ph.D. (Class of 1975).

Academic career

D. P. Kothari has served as Advisor to the Chancellor at VIT University, Vellore, and prior to that he was Head, Centre for Energy Studies at IIT Delhi (1995–97) and Principal, Visvesvaraya Regional Engineering College, Nagpur (1997–98). He has also been Director i/c, IIT Delhi (2005) and Deputy Director (Administration), IIT Delhi (2003–06). D. P. Kothari is most popularly known for his contributions to the advancement of engineering education in India. He has published and presented over 842 papers in national and international journals and conferences. He has authored and co-authored 60 books including Power System Optimization, Modern Power System Analysis, Electric Machines, Power System Transients, Theory and Problems of Electric Machines, Renewable Energy Sources and Emerging Technologies, and Power System Engineering. His research interests include: Optimal Hydro-thermal Scheduling, Unit Commitment, Maintenance Scheduling, Energy Conservation (loss minimisation and voltage control), and Power Quality and Energy Systems Planning and Modelling. He is currently an Honorary Adjunct Professor in VNIT, Nagpur.

Awards and honors

The University Grants Commission presented him the UGC National Swami Pranavananda Saraswati Award for 2005 on Education for his scholarly contributions. He is the recipient of the National Khosla Lifetime Achievement Award 2005 from the Indian Institute of Technology, Roorkee, National Award for Science and Technology from the Uttar Pradesh government in 2001 and the Eminent Engineering Personality award from the Institution of Engineers (India) for the year 2001. The World Management Congress, New Delhi, gave D. P. Kothari the Lifetime Achievement Award for 'Educational Planning and Administration' in December 2009. Dr. D. P. Kothari was selected to receive the Best Professor of the Year 2013 by Association of Scientists, Developers and Faculties.

He received Excellent Academic Award at IIT Guwahati by NPSC-2014. In 2016, he has received 9 Life Time Achievement awards by various agencies on 19 February, 4 March, 11 March, 18 March, 20 March and 25 March 2016, 20 April, 14 May 2016, 20 June 2018 respectively.

Fellowships

 Fellow – IEEE
 Life Fellow – The Institution of Engineers (India)
 Life Membership and Honorary Fellow – Indian Society for Technical Education
 Fellow – Indian National Academy of Sciences, Allahabad
 Fellow – Indian National Academy of Engineering
 Senior Member – CSI
 Fellow – IETE

Books and research papers

 D.P. Kothari and I.J. Nagrath, "Modern Power System Analysis," Tata McGraw Hill, New Delhi, 1980(7 reprints), Second Edition, 1989(25 reprints), Third Edition, 2003(16th reprint 2009); International Edition, McGraw-Hill, Singapore, 2004, McGraw-Hill, New York, 2006, Second Edition, 2007, Third Edition, 2008, Fourth Edition, 2011.
 S.S. Murthy, B.P. Singh, D.P. Kothari and C.S. Jha (Eds)"Electro mechanics Laboratory Manual," Wiley Eastern, New Delhi, 1982.
 D.P. Kothari and I.J. Nagrath, "Electric Machines," Approved by the UGC and published by Tata McGraw Hill, New Delhi with NBT subsidy, First Edition, 1985, (16 Reprints): Second Edition, 1997, (16 Reprints); Third Edition, 2004 (13th reprint 2009). FOURTH EDITION 2010.
 A.K. Mahalanabis, D.P. Kothari and S.I. Ashon, "Computer Aided Power System Analysis and Control," Tata McGraw Hill, New Delhi, 1988, (First Reprint, 1991).
 J. Nanda and D.P. Kothari (Eds.),"Recent Trends in Electric Energy Systems," Prentice Hall of India, New Delhi, 1988.
 C.M. Bhatia and D.P. Kothari (Eds.), "Power Electronics Laboratory Manual," Galgotia Book source, New Delhi, 1988.
 D.P. Kothari and I.J. Nagrath, "Theory and Problems of Electric Machines TMH Outline Series". Tata McGraw Hill, New Delhi, 1991. (Six Reprints) 2nd Edition, 2001(Fifth Reprint, 2003), International Edition, McGraw-Hill, Singapore, 2001, Sigma Series, 2006(4th reprint 2009).
 D.P. Kothari and I.J. Nagrath and, "Power Systems Engineering," Tata McGraw Hill, New Delhi, 1994. (20 Reprints);2nd edition,2007 (5th Reprint 2009).	
 A. Chakrabarti, D.P. Kothari and A.K. Mukhopadhyay, "Performance, Operation and Control of EHV Transmission Systems," Wheeler Publishing, New Delhi, 1995
 C.S. Indulkar and D.P. Kothari,K. Ramalingam "Power System Transients: A Statistical Approach," Prentice Hall of India, New Delhi, 1996. SECOND EDITION 2010.
 D.P. Kothari and I.J. Nagrath, "Theory and Problems of Basic Electrical Engineering," Prentice Hall of India, New Delhi, 1998.(11th Reprint 2009)
 D.P. Kothari and D.K. Sharma (Eds.), "Energy Engineering : Theory and Practice", S. Chand and Co. Ltd., New Delhi, 2000
 D.P Kothari and I.J. Nagrath, "Basic Electrical Engineering", TMH, New Delhi, 2nd Edn, 2002  (Twentieth Reprint 2009), 3rd Edn,2010.
 D.P. Kothari and J. S. Dhillon, "Power System Optimization", Prentice-Hall of India, 2004.(2nd Edition in Press).
 D.P. Kothari and Anshu Saxena, "Understanding Hypermedia: From Multimedia to Virtual Reality", Prentice-Hall of India, 2004.
 D.P. Kothari, Rakesh Ranjan and K.C. Singhal, "Renewable Energy Sources and Technology", Prentice-Hall of India, 2007. SECOND EDN 2011.
 Akhtar Kalam & D.P. Kothari, "Power System Protection and Communication ", New Age International (P) Limited, Publishers, New Delhi 2010.
 D.P. Kothari and P.M.V. Subba Rao, "Power Generation" in "Springer Handbook of Mechanical Engineering" ed. by  Grote, Antonsson, 2009.
 D.P. Kothari, Shailesh Upadhyay and Ujala Shanker, "Renewable Energy Technologies for Cooking: Transforming Rural Lives" IEEE Technology and Society. Fall 2013
For remaining books & papers his C.V. may be consulted in Google.

References

  13.Visit of Dr.D.P.Kothari, Technocrats Institute of Technology (Excellence) Bhopal on 16-11-2022

External links
 
 Curriculum Vitae

1944 births
Engineers from Rajasthan
Living people
Scholars from Rajasthan